Thongchai Winichakul (born 1957), is a Thai historian and researcher of Southeast Asian studies. He is professor emeritus of Southeast Asian history at the University of Wisconsin–Madison and a chief senior researcher at the Japanese Institute of Developing Economies. He was the president for the Association for Asian Studies in 2013. He has had a major impact on the concept of Thai nationalism.

Political activity
Thongchai is of Sino-Thai descent, was born and grew up in Bangkok. He was a student organizer and political activist while still in high school. He became even more involved in pro-democracy movements while in his first two years as an undergraduate at Thammasat University in Bangkok. Student and labor organizing had blossomed during and after the popular uprising of 14 October 1973.

But following the return of disempowered military dictator Thanom Kittikachorn and the resignation of Prime Minister Seni Pramoj, Thongchai and other student leaders organized a fresh wave of protests centered at Thammasat University. These culminated in a large rally that grew through the night of 5 October 1976. The next morning, 6 October, the Thai military surrounded the Thammasat campus and attacked the students in what has been described as the "Thammasat University massacre" in which at least 46 people were killed, some even being raped, hung, or burned to death. Many students escaped. Thousands of students were arrested, though 19 were eventually imprisoned, including Thongchai. Various organizations, including Amnesty International, advocated for his release as a prisoner of conscience. He was released on 16 September 1978 and allowed to return to finish his education at Thammasat on the condition that he was not involved in further political activities. He later went to Sydney, Australia, for his graduate education.

Academic career 
Thongchai completed his Bachelor of Arts degree with first class honors from Thammasat University in 1981. He received his master's degree with honors from University of Sydney in 1984. In 1988, he was conferred his doctoral degree from the same university. Subsequently, he returned to Bangkok to lecture at Thammasat University until 1991.

He was then appointed assistant professor at the University of Wisconsin. He remained in Madison, being promoted to associate professor in 1995, and full professor in 2001. He was assigned to both the Department of History and the Center for Southeast Asian Studies. Among other positions, he served as director of the Center for Southeast Asian Studies from 1997 to 1999, and director of graduate studies of the Department of History from 2008. He retired as professor emeritus in 2016.

His best-known academic work is his book Siam Mapped, published in 1994, which critiqued existing theories of Thai historiography. In its Japanese translation, the book won the Grand Prize of the 16th Asian Pacific Awards from the Asian Affairs Research Council. According to the Sojourn journal, it is one of the "most influential books of Southeast Asian Studies".

Since 1991, he has been a member of the Association for Asian Studies (AAS), chairing its Southeast Asia Council and serving on its executive board in 1996–1997. In 2012, he was vice president of the AAS, and in 2013, president. In 1994, he was awarded a Guggenheim Fellowship. Thongchai was named to the American Academy of Arts and Sciences in 2003. He was a principal research fellow at the Asia Research Institute, National University of Singapore from 2010 to 2012. In 2017, he became a chief senior researcher at the Inter-disciplinary Studies Center of the Institute of Developing Economies (IDE) in Chiba, Japan.

Selected works
 Siam Mapped: A History of the Geo-Body of a Nation. Honolulu: University of Hawaii Press, 1994. (Winner of the 1995 Harry J. Benda Prize in Southeast Asian Studies)
 "The Quest for 'Siwilai': A geographical discourse of Civilizational Thinking in the Late 19th and early 20th Century Siam", Journal of Asian Studies 59, 3 (August 2000): 528–549.
 "The Others Within: Travel and Ethno-spatial Differentiation of Siamese Subjects, 1885–1910", lead article in Civility and Savagery: Social Identity in Tai States, ed. Andrew Turton, London: Curzon Press, 2000: 38–62.
 "Remembering/ Silencing the Traumatic Past: the Ambivalent Memories of the October 1976 Massacre in Bangkok" in Cultural Crisis and Social Memory: Modernity and Identity in Thailand and Laos, ed. Charles F Keyes and Shigeharu Tanabe, London and New York: Routledge/Curzon, 2002: 243–283.
 "Writing at the Interstices: Southeast Asian Historians and Post-National Histories in Southeast Asia", leading article in New Terrains in Southeast Asian History, ed. Abu Talib Ahmad and Tan Liok Ee, Athens: Ohio University Press, 2002: 3–29.

References

External links
 Thongchai Winichakul at the University of Wisconsin–Madison
 Focus on the Humanities Lecture: Thongchai Winichakul

1957 births
Thongchai Winichakul
Living people
Historians of Thailand
Presidents of the Association for Asian Studies
Thongchai Winichakul
Thongchai Winichakul
Thai emigrants to the United States
Thongchai Winichakul
Thongchai Winichakul
Thongchai Winichakul
Thongchai Winichakul
University of Wisconsin–Madison faculty
Thongchai Winichakul